Caloptilia leucapennella is a moth of the family Gracillariidae. It is known from all of Europe, except the Balkan Peninsula.

The wingspan is about 13 mm. The posterior tibiae is smooth above. Forewings are pale whitish yellow, with some scattered minute black dots, variable in development; sometimes spots of grey strigulae, especially in disc;sometimes a ferruginous black -spotted median longitudinal streak from base of costa to apex. Hindwings are dark grey. The typical form of the adult is a pale yellowish white, but there are variations, ranging to the rufous form F. aurantiella. Adults are on wing from July to October and overwinter.

The larvae feed on evergreen oak (Quercus ilex) and common oak (Quercus robur). They mine the leaves of their host plant. The mine starts as a narrow lower-surface epidermal gallery, that widens into an oval, eventually full depth blotch between two side veins. Older larvae live freely, at first in a folded leaf margin, later in a partly rolled leaf tip. They possibly prefer young leaves.

References

External links
 Povolnya leucapennella on Lepiforum.de

leucapennella
Leaf miners
Moths described in 1835
Moths of Europe
Taxa named by James Francis Stephens